The Samara electoral district was a constituency created for the 1917 Russian Constituent Assembly election.

The electoral district covered the Samara Governorate. Electoral turnout reportedly stood at 54.86%. Out of 95 different candidate lists submitted, 79 turned down by the electoral authorities (out of which approx 42 due to late submission). The constituency had large German and Tatar minorities. In Samara city the Bolsheviks polled 42% of the vote, the SRs 27% and Kadets 14%.

Results

References

Electoral districts of the Russian Constituent Assembly election, 1917